Vasile Firea (21 August 1908 – 1991) was a Romanian racewalker. He competed in the men's 50 kilometres walk at the 1936 Summer Olympics.

References

1908 births
1991 deaths
Athletes (track and field) at the 1936 Summer Olympics
Romanian male racewalkers
Olympic athletes of Romania
Place of birth missing